The Crop Science Centre (informally known as 3CS during its planning) is an alliance between the University of Cambridge and National Institute of Agricultural Botany (NIAB).

History
The Crop Science Centre development plans began in 2015, between the University of Cambridge's Department of Plant Sciences, NIAB (National Institute of Agricultural Botany) and the Sainsbury Laboratory. The research institute received £16.9m funding in 2017 from the UK Research Partnership Investment Fund (UKRPIF) from Research England (United Kingdom Research and Innovation or UKRI) to build a new state-of-the-art building, designed exclusively for crop research, which opened on the 1st October 2020.

Structure
The Crop Science Centre is based at NIAB’s Lawrence Weaver Road HQ site in Cambridge.

References

External links
www.cropsciencecentre.org

Agricultural research institutes in the United Kingdom
Botanical research institutes
Crops
Food security
Horticultural organisations based in the United Kingdom
Organisations associated with the University of Cambridge
Research institutes established in 2015
Research institutes in Cambridge